The Queen of the Night is a 1994 Mexican drama film directed by Arturo Ripstein. It was entered into the 1994 Cannes Film Festival.

Cast
 Patricia Reyes Spíndola as Lucha Reyes
 Alberto Estrella as Pedro Calderón
 Blanca Guerra 
 Ana Ofelia Murguía as Doña Victoria
 Alex Cox as Klaus Eder
 Arturo Alegro as Oñate
 Alejandra Montoya as Luzma
 Marta Aura as Balmori
 Roberto Sosa as Gimeno
 Juan Carlos Colombo as Araujo
 Guillermo Gil as Gato Linares
 María Marcucci
 Maya Mishalska

Awards

Ariel Awards
The Ariel Awards are awarded annually by the Mexican Academy of Film Arts and Sciences in Mexico. La Reina de la Noche received six awards out of 12 nominations.

|-
|rowspan="12" scope="row"| 1996
|scope="row"| La Reina de la Noche
|scope="row"| Best Picture
| 
|-
|scope="row"| Patricia Reyes Spíndola
|rowspan="1" scope="row"| Best Actress
| 
|-
|scope="row"| Ana Ofelia Murguía
|rowspan="1" scope="row"| Best Supporting Actress
| 
|-
|scope="row"| Arturo Alegro
|rowspan="1" scope="row"| Best Actor in a Minor Role
| 
|-
|rowspan="3" scope="row"| Paz Alicia Garciadiego
|rowspan="1" scope="row"| Best Original Story
| 
|-
|rowspan="1" scope="row"| Best Screenplay
| 
|-
|rowspan="2" scope="row"| Best Original Music Theme or Song
| 
|-
|rowspan="1" scope="row"| Lucía Álvarez
| 
|-
|scope="row"| Rafael Castanedo
|rowspan="1" scope="row"| Best Editing
| 
|-
|rowspan="1" scope="row"| José Luis Aguilar
|rowspan="1" scope="row"| Best Production Design
| 
|-
|rowspan="1" scope="row"| Ángeles Martínez and Eduardo Corona
|rowspan="1" scope="row"| Best Set Design
| 
|-
|scope="row"| Graciela Mazón
|rowspan="1" scope="row"| Best Costume Design
| 
|-

References

External links

1994 films
1990s Spanish-language films
1994 drama films
Films directed by Arturo Ripstein
Mexican drama films
1990s Mexican films